Getting My Brother Laid is a 2001 German romantic comedy-drama film directed by Sven Taddicken.

Premise
Josch Klauser, Mike (Hinnerk Schönemann) and their younger sister Nic (Marie-Luise Schramm) experience ups and downs in search for their first love. Josch, the oldest of the three, is a big fan of Dracula, and mentally handicapped. He falls in love with Nadine (Julia Jentsch), who is the girlfriend of his brother Mike.

External links
 

2001 films
2001 romantic comedy-drama films
2000s teen comedy-drama films
2000s teen romance films
2000s German-language films
German romantic comedy-drama films
German teen comedy-drama films
2000s German films